The Four-Footed Ranger is a 1928 American silent Western film directed by Stuart Paton and written by Cromwell Kent, Paul M. Bryan and Gardner Bradford. The film stars Dynamite the Dog, Edmund Cobb, Margerie Bonner, Pearl Sindelar, Francis Ford and Patrick Rooney. The film was released on March 25, 1928, by Universal Pictures.

Cast     
 Dynamite the Dog as Dynamite
 Edmund Cobb as Jack Dunne
 Margerie Bonner as Katy Pearl Lee
 Pearl Sindelar as Mary Doolittle
 Francis Ford as Brom Hockley
 Patrick Rooney as Bull Becker 
 Frank Clark as Handsome Thomas
 Carl Sepulveda as Jake
 Lee Lin as Cook

References

External links
 

1928 films
1928 Western (genre) films
Universal Pictures films
Films directed by Stuart Paton
American black-and-white films
Silent American Western (genre) films
1920s English-language films
1920s American films